Map of places in Glasgow compiled from this list
See the list of places in Scotland for places in other counties.

Selected districts of Glasgow

Areas by location to the River Clyde

The following are places within the Glasgow City Council area.

Places north of the River Clyde
Anderston, Anniesland, Auchenshuggle, Baillieston, Balornock, Barlanark, Barmulloch, Barrachnie, Barrowfield, Blackhill, Blairdardie, Blochairn, Botany, Braidfauld, Bridgeton, Broomhouse, Broomhill, Budhill, Cadder, Calton, Camlachie, Carmyle, Carntyne, Colston, Cowcaddens, Cowlairs, Craigend, Cranhill, Dalmarnock, Dennistoun, Dowanhill, Drumchapel, Easterhouse, Firhill, Gallowgate, Garnethill, Garrowhill, Garscadden, Garthamlock, Germiston, Gilshochill, Greenfield, Haghill, Hamiltonhill, High Possil, High Ruchill, Hillhead, Hogganfield, Hyndland, Jordanhill, Kelvinbridge, Kelvindale, Kelvingrove, Kelvinhaugh, Kelvinside, Knightswood, Lambhill, Lancefield, Lightburn, Lilybank, Maryhill, Maryhill Park, Merchant City, Millerston, Milton, Mount Vernon, Netherton, Newbank, North Kelvinside, Park District, Parkhead, Parkhouse G22, Partick, Partickhill, Port Dundas, Possilpark, Provanhall, Provanmill, Queenslie, Riddrie, Robroyston, Royston, Ruchazie, Ruchill, Sandyford, Sandyhills, Scotstoun, Scotstounhill, Shettleston, Sighthill, Springboig, Springburn, Springhill, Stobcross, Stobhill, Summerston, Swinton, Temple, Tollcross, Townhead, Wellhouse, Whiteinch, Woodlands, Woodside, Yoker, Yorkhill.

Places South of the River Clyde
Arden, Auldhouse, Battlefield, Bellahouston, Cardonald, Carmunnock, Carnwadric, Castlemilk, Cathcart, Cessnock, Corkerhill, Cowglen, Craigton, Croftfoot, Crookston, Crosshill, Crossmyloof, Darnley, Deaconsbank, Drumoyne, Dumbreck, Eastwood, Fairfield,  Govan, Govanhill, Gorbals, Halfway, Hillington, Hillpark, Househillwood, Hurlet, Hutchesontown, Ibrox, Jenny Lind, Kennishead, King's Park, Kingston, Kinning Park, Langlands, Langshot, Langside, Laurieston, Linthouse, Mansewood, Mavisbank, Merrylee, Moorepark, Mosspark, Mount Florida, Muirend, Newlands, Nitshill, Oatlands, Parkhouse G53, Pollok, Pollokshaws, Pollokshields, Polmadie, Port Eglinton, Priesthill, Queen's Park, Rosshall, Roughmussel, Shawlands, Shieldhall, Simshill, South Nitshill, Southpark Village, Strathbungo, Summertown, Toryglen, Tradeston, Wearieston.

See also
Demography of Glasgow
List of places in Scotland
Wards of Glasgow

References

 
Places
Glasgow
Lists of places in Scotland
Populated places in Scotland